Filipe Gomes (born 7 April 1997) is a Malawian swimmer. He competed in the men's 50 metre freestyle at the 2020 Summer Olympics.

References

External links
 

1997 births
Living people
Malawian male swimmers
Malawian male freestyle swimmers
Olympic swimmers of Malawi
Swimmers at the 2020 Summer Olympics
People from Blantyre